is a 1983 Japanese film directed by Shunya Itō.

Awards
7th Japan Academy Prize 
 Won: Best Actress - Rumiko Koyanagi

References

1983 films
Films directed by Shunya Itō
1980s Japanese films